Recombinant may refer to:
 Recombinant organism – an organism that contains a different combination of alleles from either of its parents.
 Recombinant DNA – a form of artificial DNA sequence
 Recombinant protein - artificially produced (and often purified) protein
 Recombinant virus – a virus formed by recombining genetic material
 VRLA – a valve regulated lead acid (VRLA) battery that is also referred to as a recombinant battery
InSoc Recombinant – an album by synthpop band Information Society
 Recombinant Inc., - an interactive music technology company co-founded by David Cope

See also
Recombination (disambiguation)